IMU may refer to:

Science and technology
Inertial measurement unit, a device that measures acceleration and rotation, used for example to maneuver modern vehicles including motorcycles, missiles, air- and spacecraft

Businesses and organizations
I Measure U, a New Zealand company that develops inertial measurement units
Indiana Memorial Union, on the Indiana University Bloomington campus
International Mathematical Union
Irish Medical Union, since renamed the Irish Medical Organisation
Islamic Movement of Uzbekistan, Afghan Militant group
Italian Mathematical Union

Education
Indian Maritime University
International Medical University
Istanbul Medipol University

Other uses
Initial markup, in business
Intensive Management Unit, a type of prison in the United States, usually practicing solitary confinement
Interurban Multiple Units, used by Queensland Rail

See also
Imu, a type of underground oven used in Hawaiian cooking